Prospekt Svobody is a station on Dnipro Metro's Tsentralno–Zavodska Line. It is a single-vault deep subway station, accessible only by an escalator and was opened on 29 December 1995 along with the rest of the system's first stations. The station is located on the Novokodatska Square on the Prospect Svobody (for which the station is named, "Freedom Avenue").

External links

 Dnipro Metropoliten - Prospekt Svobody Station

Dnipro Metro stations
Railway stations opened in 1995